Ola Edlund is a retired Swedish footballer. Edlund made 25 Allsvenskan appearances for Djurgården and scored 2 goals.

References

Swedish footballers
Djurgårdens IF Fotboll players
Association footballers not categorized by position
Year of birth missing